The Jungle Princess is a 1936 American adventure film directed by Wilhelm Thiele starring Dorothy Lamour and Ray Milland.

Plot
Christopher Powell is in Malaya with his fiancée and her father, capturing wild animals. While out hunting he is attacked by a tiger, and his native guides run away, leaving him for dead. But the tiger is the pet of Ulah, a beautiful young woman who grew up by herself in the jungle. She rescues Chris and takes him back to her cave, where she nurses him to health and falls in love with him. When he eventually returns to camp, she follows. His fiancée is jealous, and the natives do not like Ulah or her pet tiger either, all of which leads to a lot of trouble.

Cast

 Dorothy Lamour as Ulah
 Ray Milland  as Christopher Powell
 Akim Tamiroff as Karen Neg
 Lynne Overman as Frank
 Molly Lamont as Ava
 Ray Mala as Melan (as Mala)
 Hugh Buckler as Col. Neville Lane
 Sally Martin as Ulah, as a child
 Roberta Law as Lin
 Limau as Tiger
 Bogo as Chimpanzee

Reception
Writing for The Spectator in 1937, Graham Greene gave the film a mildly positive review. He critiqued the film's hackneyed use of exaggerated social consciousness as a trope, but noted that "the climax is magnificent" and ultimately characterized it as a "lively picture".

The Jungle Princess was a major hit and launched Lamour's career as one of the leading stars of the era, often cast, sarong-clad, in similar jungle adventure romances, which led to her playing leading lady to Bing Crosby and Bob Hope in the Road to... musical comedy movie series beginning four years later.

The Indonesian film Terang Boelan (1937) was partially inspired by The Jungle Princess.

References

External links
 
 
 
 

1936 films
1936 adventure films
American black-and-white films
1930s English-language films
Paramount Pictures films
Films set in Malaysia
Films directed by Wilhelm Thiele
Jungle girls
Films with screenplays by Cyril Hume
American adventure films
1930s American films